is a Japanese footballer who plays for Tokyo 23 FC.

Playing career
Tsuchiya was born in Bunkyo, Tokyo on July 31, 1974. After graduating from high school, he moved to Brazil in 1994 and played for Noroeste, Internacional Bebedouro and Barretos. In 1997, he returned to Japan and joined J1 League club Verdy Kawasaki (later Tokyo Verdy). He debuted in August 1997 and played many matches as side back under manager Ryoichi Kawakatsu in 1998. In 1999, he moved to Vissel Kobe with manager Kawakatsu. He was converted to center back and played as regular player for 6 seasons. In 2005, he moved to Kashiwa Reysol. Although he played as regular player, the club was relegated to J2 League end of 2005 season. In 2006, he moved to Omiya Ardija. He played many matches as left side back. In 2007, he moved to J2 club Tokyo Verdy for the first time in 9 years. Although the club played in J2 League most seasons, he played as regular center back for 6 seasons. In 2013, he moved to J1 club Ventforet Kofu. He played many matches as center back except for 2014 season for injury. However his opportunity to play decreased in 2017. In August 2017, he moved to J2 club Kyoto Sanga FC and played several matches. In 2018, he moved to Regional Leagues club Tokyo 23 FC.

Club statistics
Source

References

External links

1974 births
Living people
Association football people from Tokyo
Japanese footballers
J1 League players
J2 League players
Esporte Clube Noroeste players
Associação Atlética Internacional (Bebedouro) players
Barretos Esporte Clube players
Tokyo Verdy players
Vissel Kobe players
Kashiwa Reysol players
Omiya Ardija players
Ventforet Kofu players
Kyoto Sanga FC players
Japanese expatriate footballers
Expatriate footballers in Brazil
Association football defenders